= Sharj Ba Da'N =

Coordinates: 14°57′N 48°04′E

- Interactive map of Sharj Ba Da'N
- Country: Yemen
- Governorate: Hadhramaut
- Time zone: UTC+3 (Yemen Standard Time)

Sharj Ba Da'N is a village in eastern Yemen. It is located in the Hadhramaut Governorate.
